Leo M. Cherne (1912–1999) was an American economist, public servant, and four-decade head of the International Rescue Committee.

Background

Leo M. Cherne was born on September 8, 1912, in The Bronx.  His father, Max Cherne, was a Romanian-Jewish compositor, who emigrated from Bessarabia to New York in 1904.  Cherne graduated from New York Law School in 1935.

Career

First, Cherne practiced law.

Research Institute of America

During the New Deal, he specialized in Social Security and, with a Bible salesman named Carl Hovgard, sold a book about it. This venture grew into the Research Institute of America (RIA), founded to translate complex government legislation for the businessman.  During World War II, he advised government on industry mobilization; after the war, he advised General Douglas MacArthur on how to reconstruct the economy of Japan.  In 1947, Cherne, as executive secretary of the RIA, had Academy Films make a 30-minute counter-attacking movie called Crossroads for America.  It came in response to the pro-union Deadline for Action. Carl Marzani of Union Films had made the 40-minute documentary Deadline for Action on behalf of the United Electrical, Radio and Machine Workers of America (UE) and "severely criticized powerful corporations such as General Electric and Westinghouse," whose workers the UE had organized.  At a press conference on 1 October 1947, Cherne presented his film by claiming, "Avoidance of another major depression by steadily increasing productivity is the surest means to thwart Communist designs against the American economic and social system."  Cherne also claimed that the film showed "methods whereby American business concerns can counteract Communist influence on rank-and-file workers by supplying them with truthful statements."

International Rescue Committee (IRC)

In 1946, Cherne joined the board of the  International Rescue Committee (IRC).  In 1951, he became IRC chairman. In 1956, he personally helped deliver medical supplies over the border during the Hungarian uprising.  He went to Cuba in the late 1950s early 1960s, Cambodia in 1975, and Kenya in 1977. Eventually, Cherne succeeded theologian Reinhold Niebuhr as IRC chairman. He resigned in 1991.

Other activities

Although anti-Communist, Cherne challenged US Senator Joseph McCarthy in 1952.

Cherne was a public policy expert who became a principal co-anchor of ABC-TV's All-Star News, the first hour-long prime time nightly network news broadcast, in the 1952-1953 television season. While not a ratings success against entertainment programs on NBC and CBS, All-Star News is credited as pointing the way toward the format later used by long-form local news broadcasts in cities across America in the 1960s and beyond and by CNN and other national and international cable news networks since 1980.  Cherne served as chairman of the executive committee of Freedom House, established to advance the struggle for freedom at home and abroad.

Cherne advised nine presidents by serving as a member of the Foreign Intelligence Advisory Board from 1973 to 1991. He was also a member of the U.S. Select Committee for Western Hemisphere Immigration and the U.S. Advisory Commission on International Educational and Cultural Affairs.

Personal life and death

Cherne was a gifted sculptor. His bust of Albert Schweitzer was displayed in the Smithsonian, his head of Abraham Lincoln in the Cabinet Room of the White House, and his bust of John F. Kennedy is in the National Portrait Gallery.

William F. Buckley Jr. called Cherne "one of the most combative men ever bred... If he thought he was right about something, he would spend from now until doomsday pressing his view."

Leo Cherne died age 86 on January 12, 1999, in New York.

Awards
In 1971, he received the Golden Plate Award of the American Academy of Achievement.

In 1984, US President Ronald Reagan awarded Cherne the Medal of Freedom for his "moral passion" in the service of refugees.

In 1989, Cherne received the S. Roger Horchow Award for Greatest Public Service by a Private Citizen, an award given out annually by Jefferson Awards.

Miscellaneous

Cherne may have been the actual source of a popular quotation, often misattributed to Albert Einstein: "The computer is incredibly fast, accurate, and stupid. Man is incredibly slow, inaccurate, and brilliant. The marriage of the two is a force beyond calculation."

References

External links
 
Some biographical information
 Rescuing the World: The Life and Times of Leo Cherne, by Andrew F. Smith, is a biography of Cherne.

1912 births
1999 deaths
20th-century American economists
ABC News personalities
Economists from New York (state)
American people of Romanian-Jewish descent
New York Law School alumni
People from the Bronx
Presidential Medal of Freedom recipients
Commanders Crosses of the Order of Merit of the Federal Republic of Germany